Saranda Hashani (born 20 May 1996) is an Albanian footballer who plays for FSV Gütersloh 2009.

See also
List of Albania women's international footballers

External links 
 

1996 births
Living people
Albanian women's footballers
Women's association football forwards
Expatriate women's footballers in Switzerland
Swiss Women's Super League players
FC Zürich Frauen players
Albania women's international footballers
FSV Gütersloh 2009 players